SPARCS (Star-Planet Activity Research CubeSat) is an American ultraviolet space nano-telescope in the CubeSat 6U format (30x20x10 cm at launch, 12 kg) whose objective is to study the near and far ultraviolet radiation of stars of the M (0.1 to 0.6 solar mass) of our galaxy. The mission selected by NASA is developed and managed by Arizona State University with the participation of the Jet Propulsion Laboratory (JPL) which provides the telescope and its detectors.

The objective of the SPARCS mission is to study the ultraviolet emissions of around ten red dwarfs in order to model its impact. SPARCS is with ASTERIA one of the first space astronomy missions using the extremely miniaturized CubeSat format. This new category of satellite opens up prospects in the field of long-term observations of astronomical phenomena thanks to their reduced cost.

References 

CubeSats
NASA satellites orbiting Earth
Space telescopes orbiting Earth
Ultraviolet telescopes
University of Arizona
Jet Propulsion Laboratory